Jani Tanskanen (born 28 November 1975) is a Finnish former artistic gymnast. He was the 1997 World Champion on high bar, and the first Finnish gold medalist at the World Championships since 1950. He is the current President of the Athletes' Commission for the International Gymnastics Federation as well as the athlete representative of Men's Artistic Gymnastics.

References 

1975 births
Living people
Finnish male artistic gymnasts
Sportspeople from Jyväskylä
Medalists at the World Artistic Gymnastics Championships
World champion gymnasts
Universiade medalists in gymnastics
Universiade silver medalists for Finland
Medalists at the 2003 Summer Universiade
20th-century Finnish people